The Myazigon Pagoda (sometimes known as the Myasigon Pagoda) is a Buddhist temple in Taungoo, Myanmar. Built in either the 16th or 19th century, the temple contains several images of members of the Toungoo dynasty (which ruled Taungoo) and a large sitting bronze statue of the Buddha that was captured in a Toungoo war against the Ayutthaya Kingdom.

References 

Buddhist pilgrimage sites in Myanmar
Pagodas in Myanmar
Historic sites in Myanmar